Mark C. Duncan (born c. 1919) is a former American football player, coach, and administrator, and basketball coach. He served as the head football coach and the interim head basketball coach at the University of Denver in 1943.

Duncan later embarked on a career in the National Football League (NFL). He was as an assistant coach for the San Francisco 49ers from 1955 to 1962.

In 1964, Duncan was named the NFL's supervisor of officials, and three years later, he was named the League's director of personnel. From 1973 to 1974, he was the director of player personnel for the Los Angeles Rams, and from 1975 to 1978, he served as an assistant general manager for the Seattle Seahawks.

Head coaching record

Football

References

1910s births
Year of birth uncertain
Possibly living people
American football guards
Colorado State Rams baseball coaches
Colorado State Rams football coaches
Denver Pioneers baseball coaches
Denver Pioneers football players
Denver Pioneers football coaches
Denver Pioneers men's basketball coaches
Denver Pioneers men's basketball players
National Football League executives
Los Angeles Rams executives
Seattle Seahawks executives